Bapu Kaldate (1 December 1929 – 17 November 2011) was an Indian politician. He was elected to the Lok Sabha, the lower house of Indian Parliament, in 1977 from Aurangabad in Maharashtra. He was earlier elected to Maharashtra Legislative Assembly. He was a member of the Rajya Sabha the upper house of Indian Parliament, representing Maharashtra for two terms from 1984 to 1996 as member of the Janata Dal. He refused to defect from his party and turned down an offer of a cabinet berth from Chandrasekhar .

References

External links
 Official biographical sketch in Parliament of India website

Kaldate Bapu
Lok Sabha members from Maharashtra
Marathi politicians
1929 births
2011 deaths
India MPs 1977–1979
Janata Dal politicians
Maharashtra MLAs 1967–1972
People from Aurangabad district, Maharashtra
People from Marathwada
Indians imprisoned during the Emergency (India)
Janata Party politicians
Samyukta Socialist Party politicians